Julie James Doyle (born Julie Rachel James; December 31, 1996) is an American professional soccer player who played for Sky Blue FC of the National Women's Soccer League (NWSL).

Early life

Baylor Bears
Doyle played four years for Baylor University finishing her Bears career with a career 20 goals and 13 assists in 88 appearances.  During her senior year she was named a semi-finalist for the MAC Hermann Trophy Award as well as became the first student-athlete in Baylor program history to earn the prestigious United Soccer Coaches All-America first team honors.

The two-time captain logged more minutes (7809), the most of any player Baylor Bears women's soccer history.  She finished her university career in the top 10 all-time for career goals scored and points totaled.

Club career

Sky Blue FC, 2019
Doyle was selected by Sky Blue FC with the 11th overall pick in the 2019 NWSL College Draft. In doing so she became the first student-athlete from Baylor to be drafted into the NWSL.  She signed with the club in March 2019.

Doyle made her club regular season debut on April 13, 2019.

International career
In 2018 Doyle was named to several United States U-23 training camps. This was her first national team call up since 2014, when she had trained with the U-20 USWNT.

Personal life
She married Connor Doyle in May 2019.

Career statistics 
As of April 20, 2019

References

External links
 Sky Blue FC  
 

Living people
1996 births
American women's soccer players
Baylor Bears women's soccer players
National Women's Soccer League players
People from Collin County, Texas
NJ/NY Gotham FC draft picks
NJ/NY Gotham FC players
Soccer players from Texas
Sportspeople from the Dallas–Fort Worth metroplex
Women's association football forwards